Freaky Girl or Freaky Girls may refer to:
"Freaky Girl", a song by Mad Professor from the album Dub Maniacs on the Rampage
"Freaky Girl", a song by Shaggy from the album Hot Shot
"Freaky Gurl", a song by Gucci Mane first released in 2006 on his album Hard to Kill
"Freaky Girls", a song by Megan Thee Stallion featuring SZA from the album Good News
"10 Freaky Girls", a song by Metro Boomin featuring 21 Savage from the album Not All Heroes Wear Capes

See also
"I Love It" (Kanye West and Lil Pump song), which was released in a "Freaky Girl Edit"